The 2021 season for  was the 14th season in the team's existence. After starting out as a UCI Continental team and spending most of its existence as a UCI Professional Continental team/UCI ProTeam, the team was promoted to a UCI WorldTeam, taking over the WorldTeam license of the disbanded . In addition, French supermarket brand Intermarché joined Belgian engineering companies Wanty and Groupe Gobert as co-title sponsors.

Team roster 

Riders who joined the team for or during the 2021 season

Riders who left the team during or after the 2020 season

Season victories

National, Continental, and World Champions

Notes

References

External links 
 

Intermarché–Wanty–Gobert Matériaux
Intermarché–Wanty–Gobert Matériaux
Intermarché–Wanty–Gobert Matériaux